Magical Journey is the fifth studio album by Taiwanese girl group S.H.E. It was released on 6 February 2004. The album was released simultaneously in two versions: the Magical Version and the Journey version. The miniature diorama featured on the Magical Version's cover was created in collaboration with the Miniatures Museum of Taiwan. On the Journey Version's cover, HIM International Music (HIM) rented a bus. To commemorate S.H.E's trip to Hokkaidō, Japan to film the music video for the song "He Still Doesn't Understand" (他還是不懂), the Magical Version featured 50-minute VCD while the Journey Version featured a 24-page photobook.

Track listing
 波斯貓(Persian Cat)
 十面埋伏(Ten-Sided Ambush)
 他還是不懂(He Still Can't Understand)
 Only Lonely
 找不到(Can't Find it)
 五天四夜(Five Day, Four Nights)
 安全感(A Safe Sense)
 Never Mind
 茱羅記(The Story Of Romeo And Juliet)
 一起開始的旅程(The Journey of Us From the Beginning)

Music videos
The video for "He Still Can't Understand" is based on unrequited love, with dialogue in Japanese, Korean and Mandarin. Both "Five Days and Four Nights" and "The Journey of Us From the Beginning" are based on themes of friendship. The former video is a series of experiences in which the members of S.H.E are enjoying themselves; the latter video is a story of three girls on a road trip. The car breaks down, so the girls look for help. During their search, they get hungry, and eventually approach a man to trade two coffees for an ice cream cone. At the end of the video, a cyclist eventually helps the girls by towing the car with his bicycle. "A Safe Sense" is the story of a boy who is all too careful about his environment, and goes to nuns for help. However, the nuns are arrested by the police at the end of the video.

References

2004 albums
S.H.E albums
HIM International Music albums